Siefert is a surname, and may refer to:

 Annemarie Gethmann-Siefert, professor of philosophy at the University of Hagen, Germany.
 Janet Siefert, origin of life researcher
 Louisa Siefert (1845–1877), French poet
 Paul Siefert, (1586–1666), German composer and organist 
 Silvia Siefert (b. 1953), former East German Olympic handball medalist

See also
Seifert
Seyfert (disambiguation)

Surnames from given names